Richard Ciro Aurelien Lippi (21 October 1948 – 6 December 1988) was a French rower. He competed in the men's coxed pair event at the 1968 Summer Olympics.

References

1948 births
1988 deaths
French male rowers
Olympic rowers of France
Rowers at the 1968 Summer Olympics
People from Alpes-Maritimes